Beaulieu v Finglam is a landmark and precedent setting case in English tort law. While specifically it set strict liability for the escape of fire, the judgment also demarcated the limits of responsibility and liability for tort cases. It also established the first ratio of what would become duty of care. Though a duty of care with regard to water and animals  had already been established.

Judgment

References

1400s in law
House of Lords cases
Negligence case law
United Kingdom tort case law
1401 in Europe
1400s in England